The following is a list of clubs who have played in the Nemzeti Bajnokság I handball league at any time since its formation in 1951.

Key

Coloumns

Rows

The chart contains the 2013-14 season, too.

List of clubs

Notes

Most seasons
The following clubs, 74 in total, have participated in the Hungarian League since its inception in 1951 until the 2018–19 season.

As of 11 April 2019.
 58 seasons: PLER
 49 seasons: Győri ETO, Tatabánya
 43 seasons: Szeged
 38 seasons: Ferencváros, Veszprém
 35 seasons: Pécs
 33 seasons: Debreceni Dózsa
 31 seasons: Budapest Honvéd
 28 seasons: Újpest
 26 seasons: Budapesti Spartacus
 25 seasons: Dunaferr, Ózd
 21 seasons: Komlói Bányász
 20 seasons: VM Egyetértés
 19 seasons: Vasas
 16 seasons: Csepel, Nyíregyháza
 14 seasons: Cegléd
 12 seasons: Balatonfüred, Gyöngyös, Százhalombatta
 11 seasons: Csurgó, Várpalotai Bányász
 10 seasons: Békéscsabai Előre, Honvéd Szondi SE, Mezőkövesd, Orosháza, Pécsi Bányász, Szolnok
 9 seasons: Diósgyőr, Csömör, Hargita, Győri Textiles, PEMÜ, Testnevelési Egyetem
 6 seasons: Debreceni KSE, Martfű
 5 seasons: Békés, Budapesti EAC, Kecskemét, Nagykanizsai Izzó, Vác
 4 seasons: Budapesti Kábel, Debreceni VSC, DVTK-Eger, Hort, SZEOL-Délép1
 3 seasons: Balmazújváros, Budakalász, Hódiköt, Kiskőrös
 2 seasons: ETO-SZESE, Dabas, Dunakeszi Vasutas, VL Kistext, Miskolci VSC, Szigetvár, Tatai AC, Telefongyár, Veszprémi Haladás
 1 seasons: III. Kerületi TVE, Alkaloida, Budapesti Illatszer, Férfiruha SK, Honvéd Budai SE, VL Lőrinci Fonó, Malév SC, Rév TSC, Székesfehérvári MÁV Előre, Szilasmenti Tsz, Tiszaföldvári VSE, Törökszentmiklósi SE, Vecsés

As of 11 April 2019

Notes
 The teams in bold are competing in the 2018–19 season of the Hungarian League.
1 Délép SC in the 1985 season after the merger with SZEOL SC played as SZEOL-Délép SE.

By city
Correct as of 5 June 2016.

See also
 Nemzeti Bajnokság I
 The bolded teams are currently playing in the 2014-15 season of the Hungarian League.
 R = Relegated from the NB I
 D = Dissolved
 List of Nemzeti Bajnokság I clubs (football)
 List of Országos Bajnokság I (men's water polo) clubs

References

External links
 Hungarian Handball Federaration 

Handball leagues in Hungary
Nemzeti
Nemzeti